The Wendell-West Open was a golf tournament on the LPGA Tour from 1969 to 1970. It was played at the Ocean Shores Golf Club in Ocean Shores, Washington.

Winners
1970 JoAnne Carner
1969 Kathy Whitworth

References

External links
Tournament results at Golfobserver.com

Former LPGA Tour events
Golf in Washington (state)
History of Ocean Shores, Washington
1969 establishments in Washington (state)
1970 disestablishments in Washington (state)
History of women in Washington (state)